Staszewski (feminine Staszewska) is a Polish surname, it may refer to:
 Dorota Staszewska, Polish sport sailor
 Kazik Staszewski, Polish singer
 Mariusz Staszewski, Polish speedway rider
 Stanisław Staszewski, Polish architect and poet
 Stefan Staszewski, Jewish-Polish communist apparatchik

Polish-language surnames